Kareem Moore (born August 13, 1984) is a former American football safety. He was drafted by the Washington Redskins in the sixth round of the 2008 NFL Draft.  He played college football at Nicholls State University, where he was named second-team Associated Press All-American and SLC Newcomer of the Year. Prior to Nicholls State, Moore played at Itawamba Community College, where he earned JUCO All-American honors and Ole Miss.

Professional career

Washington Redskins
The Washington Redskins selected Moore in the sixth round of the 2008 NFL Draft. He made his NFL debut in Week 3 against the Arizona Cardinals. Moore would then have his first career start in the last game in the 2008 season against the San Francisco 49ers. He played in 14 games, starting one of them, and recorded  17 combined tackles.

Moore had his first interception in Week 13 of the 2009 season against the New Orleans Saints. At the end of the season, he played in all 16 games, starting one of them, and recorded 34 combined tackles, three pass break-ups, one interception, and two forced fumbles.

In the 2010 season, Moore became the team's starting free safety. His first season as regular starter was cut short after he was placed on injured reserve on December 29, 2010, due to a knee injury.

At the start of the 2011 season, Moore was placed on the physically unable to perform list, which meant he would miss the first six games of the season. On November 15, 2011, he was released from the team.

References

External links
Nicholls State Colonels bio
Washington Redskins bio
NFL bio

1984 births
Living people
Players of American football from Mississippi
People from Tupelo, Mississippi
American football cornerbacks
American football safeties
Nicholls Colonels football players
Ole Miss Rebels football players
Washington Redskins players